The Harvard–Yale soccer rivalry is a rivalry between Harvard University and Yale University. The men's series has been played regularly since 1907, while the women's teams have played since 1977. For over fifty years, the annual Harvard–Yale soccer game was played as a "curtain raiser" to the schools' gridiron football game, known simply as The Game. In addition to its varsity soccer teams which compete in the Ivy League, the two schools' intramural soccer champions have regularly featured in the annual Harkness Cup games, named after Edward Harkness, a benefactor of both universities.

History 
The soccer rivalry between Harvard and Yale has been compared to the association football rivalry between Cambridge University and Oxford University.

Early years 

The early history of the soccer rivalry between the men's sides dates back to the 1870s, and is intertwined with the evolution of gridiron football and rugby union as sports. The two schools finally played each other in 1875, after Yale, which had been following soccer rules, agreed to play according to the rugby-style rules adopted by Harvard, and lost, 4–0.

From 1906 to 1925, both Harvard and Yale participated in the Intercollegiate Soccer Football League (ISFL), which included several East Coast colleges that would later be part of the Ivy League. During that period, Yale and Harvard each won the ISFL championship twice, based on their win-loss records for those seasons. In 1926, the league became known as the Intercollegiate Soccer Football Association (ISFA). The ISFA declared Harvard, Yale, and University of Pennsylvania as joint champions for 1930, after each team finished the season undefeated, except for losing to each other, with Yale beating Harvard, 1–0.

Annual sports weekend 
Through the 1980s, the Harvard–Yale men's soccer game was "a big part of the schools' traditional sports weekend" in November. In 1931, the annual Harvard–Yale soccer day took place on the Harvard Business School Field, with matches between their varsity, junior varsity, and freshman teams. Starting in 1935, intramural teams at Harvard and Yale began playing each other on the Friday before the main varsity gridiron football game, as part of the annual Harkness Cup competition, a series that was "uncommon if not unheard of elsewhere", according to an article in The New York Times.  

In 1960, The Boston Globe suggested that the Harvard–Yale soccer game might be a bigger draw than the annual freshman football game for the first time, due to the popularity of Christian Ohiri, a Nigerian international who played for Harvard. In 1962, Sports Illustrated reported that the largest crowds on the Friday before The Harvard–Yale Game were at the soccer game and at the freshman football game, with approximately 3,500 people attending each. 

In 1965, Yale defeated Harvard 6–3 in its first win against Harvard in soccer since 1956; they had tied in 1960. Future United States senator John Kerry, then a Yale senior, scored a hat-trick, which he has referred to as his greatest achievement as an athlete. 

In 1985, The New York Times reported that although Harvard won the annual varsity soccer game, 4–1, Yale won the junior varsity soccer game, as well as the Edward S. Harkness Cup for winning all four matches between the two schools' intramural champions in men's soccer, women's soccer, tackle football, and touch football. It was the 27th time that Yale had won the Harkness Cup in the history of the series; Harvard had won 15 times, and the schools had split the trophy five times.

From the 1990s to present 
In the 1990s, the Harvard and Yale men's soccer teams' seasons ended earlier than the gridiron football teams' seasons, contributing to the decline in fanfare surrounding The Game. While a 2000 article in The Harvard Crimson acknowledged that the women's soccer rivalry between the two schools "isn't as intense as the football version", the same newspaper reported in 2013 that coaches for both the Bulldogs and the Crimson agreed that the annual game between the two rivals' men's soccer teams "brings a special excitement beyond just a regular conference game." In 2011, the Yale Daily News noted that that the Jonathan Edwards College men's soccer team was representing Yale in the Harkness Cup series for the second consecutive year after defeating Harvard's Kirkland House on penalty kicks in 2010.

In 2019, The Harvard Independent reported that "The Harvard women have proved themselves to hold power over the Yale soccer program, losing only once to the Bulldogs over the past 12 years." At the time, the Harvard women's varsity team had a 32–9–2 record against Yale; the men's team was at 55–39–12. 

As of 2022, the Harvard and Yale varsity men's soccer teams have met 108 times, while the women's sides have played 45 times.

Men's results 

Source:

Women's results 

Source:

See also 
 Harvard–Yale football rivalry
 Harvard–Yale hockey rivalry
 Harvard–Yale Regatta

References 

College soccer rivalries in the United States
Harvard Crimson men's soccer
Harvard Crimson women's soccer
Yale Bulldogs men's soccer
Yale Bulldogs women's soccer